Seyed Davoud Seyed Abbasi (born 20 February 1977 in Tehran, Iran) is a retired Iranian football player who last played in the midfield position. He was a member of the Azadegan League club, Parseh.

Club career
Abbasi started his career at Fajr Sepah, before joining Shirazi club F.C. Fajr Sepasi.  He displayed great form there and was called up to the Olympic team and eventually national team because of it.  With more impressive performances he was noticed by the bigger clubs in Iran and was signed by the powerhouse Esteghlal F.C.  The competition for him was too much and he moved to Sanat Naft Abadan F.C. for the 2002–03 season. He was one of few non-Abadani players who was supported by the passionate Naft fans, but left after one season, returning to Esteghlal F.C.  His stay there was once again very short and he left Esteghlal for Sepahan F.C. He was eventually able to regain his old form and was called up again to the national team during the same time. Esteghlal's fierce rival, Persepolis F.C. signed him in 2005.  He is currently playing for the club, despite rumors at one point, stating that former Persepolis manager, Arie Haan, wanted him out.  He stayed for another season but was mostly benched so he moved to Steel Azin and played in the first division.  He stayed there for one season and then moved to Aboomoslem where he had another average season.

Club career statistics

 Assist Goals

International career
Seyed Abbasi's international career has been limited to appearances for the Olympic team and brief appearances as a substitute on the senior national team. His first cap was on 2 June 2002 versus Syria. He had 13 caps and no goals for Team Melli.

Honours
Fajr Sepasi
 Hazfi Cup (1): 2000–01

Esteghlal
 Hazfi Cup (1): 2001–02

References

 Seyed Abbasi at TeamMelli.com
 

 

1977 births
Living people
Iranian footballers
fajr Sepasi players
Esteghlal F.C. players
Persepolis F.C. players
Sanat Naft Abadan F.C. players
Steel Azin F.C. players
Paykan F.C. players
F.C. Aboomoslem players
Iran international footballers
2000 AFC Asian Cup players
Aluminium Hormozgan F.C. players
Association football midfielders
Sportspeople from Tehran
Persian Gulf Pro League managers
Shahr Khodro F.C. managers